Airlines for Europe (A4E) is the largest EU airline association, representing 70% of European air traffic.

History 
A4E was founded in January 2016 by Europe's five largest carriers: Air France–KLM Group, easyJet, International Airlines Group, Lufthansa Group and Ryanair Holdings and serves as the united voice of European commercial airlines in Brussels.  

A4E currently counts 16 leading airline groups as its members.  New carriers both big and small, from low-cost to leaser, legacy and cargo have joined A4E. Beyond airlines, global manufacturers such as Airbus, Boeing, Embraer, GE, and Thales are also members of A4E.

Objectives
The main goal of this association is to address key policy issues affecting passengers and cargo while promoting long-term solutions to benefit Europe's aviation sector, including: 

  Improving European airspace efficiency and securing a Single European Sky.

  Revising Europe's Air Passenger Rights legislation.
  Improving safety and security measures for airlines and their passengers.  
  Tackling airport market power and excessive aviation taxes and charges.
  Moving towards a zero or low-carbon economy and thereby supporting efforts to achieve the objectives of the Paris Agreement.

Members

Airline members
At September 2020, the following airline groups are members of A4E: 

A Founding Members 
B Including subsidiaries 
C Cargo fleet

Manufacturing members
There are also 5 international aircraft manufacturers who are participating in this organization.
 Airbus
 Boeing
 Embraer
 GE Aviation
 Thales Group

Associate members
One Sky Solutions
Rechtsanwälte
Oracle Solicitors

See also 
 Association of European Airlines (AEA)
 European Low Fares Airline Association (ELFAA)
 European Regions Airline Association

References

External links 
 Official website

 
Airline trade associations
Organizations established in 2016
2016 establishments in Europe
Organisations based in Brussels